Live at Smalls is a live album by American jazz pianist Ethan Iverson's quartet. The band consisted of Iverson on piano, Reid Anderson on double bass, Jeff Williams on drums, and Bill McHenry on tenor saxophone. The album was recorded on 8 February 2000 at Smalls Jazz Club in New York City and released in 2000 by Fresh Sound New Talent label.

Reception
David R. Adler of AllMusic stated, "Pianist Ethan Iverson and tenor saxophonist Bill McHenry focus on quirky readings of standards in this co-led band, which they've unofficially named "Sub-Standard." The quartet is completed by bassist Reid Anderson and drummer Jeff Williams, both of whom supply a kind of perpetually off-kilter rhythmic feel underneath the two adventurous soloists. The music's in tempo, but not quite..."

Track listing

Personnel
 Ethan Iverson – piano 
 Bill McHenry – tenor saxophone
 Reid Anderson – double bass
 Jeff Williams – drums

References 

Ethan Iverson albums
2000 albums